Carl Paul Maria Romme (21 December 1896 – 16 October 1980) was a Dutch politician of the defunct Roman Catholic State Party (RKSP) and later co-founder of the Catholic People's Party (KVP) now merged into the Christian Democratic Appeal (CDA) party and jurist. He was granted the honorary title of Minister of State on 16 December 1971.

Romme attended the Amsterdams Lyceum from June 1909 until June 1914 and applied at the University of Amsterdam in June 1914 majoring in Law and obtaining a Bachelor of Laws degree before graduating with an Master of Laws degree in July 1919. Romme worked as a lawyer in Amsterdam from September 1919 until June 1937. Romme also worked as a trade association executive for the Catholic Employers association from November 1919 until December 1924 and was a contributing editor for the magazines Het Patroonsblad and De RK Werkgever from February 1920 until December 1924. Romme served on the Municipal Council of Amsterdam from April 1921 until June 1937 and served on the Provincial-Council of North Holland from June 1935 until June 1937. Romme also became active in the private sector and public sector and occupied numerous seats as a corporate director and nonprofit director on several boards of directors and supervisory boards (Brill Publishers, Elsevier and the Concertgebouw) and served on several state commissions and councils on behalf of the government (Mine Council and the Council for Culture). Romme also worked as an associate professor of Labour law and at the Tilburg University from 1 January 1933 until 1 January 1935 and as a distinguished professor of Labour law, Administrative law and Constitutional law and at the Tilburg University from 1 January 1935 until 24 June 1937. Romme became a Member of the House of Representatives after the resignation of Leo Guit, serving from 31 January 1933 until 9 May 1933. Romme was elected as a Member of the Senate after the Senate election of 1937, taking office on 8 June 1937. After the election of 1937 Romme was appointed as Minister of Social Affairs in the Cabinet Colijn IV, taking office on 24 June 1937. The Cabinet Colijn IV fell on 29 June 1939 and continued to serve in a demissionary capacity until the cabinet formation of 1939 when it was replaced by the Cabinet Colijn V on 25 July 1939.

Romme again worked as a lawyer in Amsterdam from January 1940 until June 1946. On 10 May 1940 Nazi Germany invaded the Netherlands and the government fled to London to escape the German occupation. During World War II Romme continued to work as a lawyer. In December 1941 Romme was arrested and detained in Amsterdam and was released in January 1942. On 4 May 1942 Romme was arrested again and detained in Sint-Michielsgestel but was released four days later on 7 May 1942. Following the end of World War II Romme became actively involved with politics again and was one of the primary initiators for reforming the Roman Catholic State Party. On 22 December 1945 the Roman Catholic State Party was renamed as the Catholic People's Party, Romme was one of the co-founders and was selected as the first Leader of the Catholic People's Party and the Lijsttrekker (top candidate) of the Catholic People's Party for the election of 1946 on 10 January 1946. The Catholic People's Party had 31 seats in the House of House of Representatives previously held by the Roman Catholic State Party and made a small win, gaining 1 seat and remained the largest party and now had 32 seats in the House of Representatives. Romme was elected again as a Member of the House of Representatives and became the Parliamentary leader of the Catholic People's Party in the House of Representatives on 4 June 1946. Romme served continuously as Leader and Parliamentary leader for the next 15 years and was Lijsttrekker for the elections of 1948, 1952, 1956 and 1959.

Decorations

Honorary degrees

References

External links

  Mr.Dr. C.P.M. (Carl) Romme Parlement & Politiek
  Mr. C.P.M. Romme (RKSP) Eerste Kamer der Staten-Generaal

 

 
 

1896 births
1980 deaths
Lawyers from Amsterdam
Catholic People's Party politicians
Commanders of the Order of the Netherlands Lion
Dutch academic administrators
Dutch columnists
Dutch corporate directors
Dutch legal writers
Dutch magazine editors
Dutch nonprofit directors
Dutch nonprofit executives
Dutch political commentators
Dutch political party founders
Dutch prisoners of war in World War II
Dutch Roman Catholics
Dutch scholars of constitutional law
Dutch trade association executives
General League of Roman Catholic Caucuses politicians
Grand Crosses 1st class of the Order of Merit of the Federal Republic of Germany
Grand Crosses of the Order of the House of Orange
Grand Officers of the Order of Orange-Nassau
Grand Officers of the Order of the Crown (Belgium)
Grand Officiers of the Légion d'honneur
Knights Commander with Star of the Order of St. Gregory the Great
Knights of the Holy Sepulchre
Labour law scholars
Members of the Council of State (Netherlands)
Members of the House of Representatives (Netherlands)
Members of the Provincial Council of North Holland
Members of the Royal Netherlands Academy of Arts and Sciences
Members of the Senate (Netherlands)
Ministers of Social Affairs of the Netherlands
Ministers of State (Netherlands)
Municipal councillors of Amsterdam
People from Oirschot
People from Tilburg
Roman Catholic State Party politicians
Scholars of administrative law
Academic staff of Tilburg University
University of Amsterdam alumni
World War II civilian prisoners
World War II prisoners of war held by Germany
Writers from Amsterdam
20th-century Dutch civil servants
20th-century Dutch lawyers
20th-century Dutch male writers
20th-century Dutch politicians